Brigitte Bardot Sings is the debut album of French singer and actress Brigitte Bardot and was released in 1963. The album includes the song "L'Appareil À Sous", which was written by Serge Gainsbourg.

Track listing
 L'Appareil À Sous	
 Les Amis De La Musique	
 El Cuchipe	
 Je Me Donne À Qui Me Plaît	
 Invitango	
 C'Est Rigolo	
 La Madrague	
 Pas D'Avantage	
 Everybody Loves My Baby	
 Rose D'Eau	
 Noir Et Blanc	
 Faite Pour Dormir

References

1963 albums
Brigitte Bardot albums
French-language albums